Ivan Sergeyevich Stepanenko (born 12 November 1995) is a Kazakhstani ice hockey player for Beibarys Atyrau and the Kazakhstani national team.

He represented Kazakhstan at the 2021 IIHF World Championship.

References

External links

1995 births
Living people
Beibarys Atyrau players
Kazakhstani ice hockey defencemen
Sportspeople from Karaganda
Asian Games gold medalists for Kazakhstan
Medalists at the 2017 Asian Winter Games
Asian Games medalists in ice hockey
Ice hockey players at the 2017 Asian Winter Games